Zayd Abu Zayd (ابو زيد,  1195 – 1265/1270) was the last Almohad governor of Valencia. 

He succeeded as governor of Valencia to his uncle Abū `Abd Allāh Muhammad. At the death of the Almohad caliph Yaqub al-Mansur, he gained complete autonomy thanks to dynastic struggle that ensued. However, due to its position surrounded by enemies, in 1225 he decided to declare himself a vassal of King James I of Aragon. In 1227 he recognized al-Mamun, former governor of Córdoba and Seville, as legitimate Almohad caliph. Two years later, after having been expelled from the Taifa of Valencia (Balensiya) by Zayyan ibn Mardanish, he fled to Aragon, where he obtained by James the right to invade the Muslim territory of Valencia.

Abu Zayd remained a loyal ally of James I, and in 1236 he converted to Catholicism, adopting the name of Vicente Bellvis, a fact which he however kept secret until the fall of Valencia. Under the protection of the Christian king, he held the seigniory over several localities in the Sierra de Espadán, which were inherited by his son Fernando after his death.

See also
Taifa of Valencia

References

General references
 
 Burns, p. 112.
 Barceló Torres, María del Carmen. El Sayyid Abu Zayd: Príncipe musulmán, señor cristiano. Awraq. Studies in Contemporary Islam and the Arab World, 3 (Madrid: Institute for Cooperation with the Arab World, 1980), p. 101-109.
 Burns, Robert I. Príncipe almohade y converso mudéjar: Nueva documentación sobre Abū Zayd. Sharq al-Andalus: Estudios árabes, 4 (Alicante: University, 1987), pp. 109–122.

People from the Almohad Caliphate
1190s births
1260s deaths
12th-century Berber people
13th-century Berber people
Andalusian former Muslims
Berber Christians
Converts to Roman Catholicism from Islam
13th-century people from al-Andalus
Christians from al-Andalus
Taifa of Valencia
Governors of the Almohad Caliphate